San-Nicolao (French form) or San Nicolao (Italian form;  or ), is a commune in the Haute-Corse department, on the island of Corsica, France.

Population

Geography
San Nicolao is located in the east side of the island.

See also
Communes of the Haute-Corse department

References

Communes of Haute-Corse